Seko Shamte (born 29 October 1981) is a Tanzanian film producer, writer and director.

Early life 
Seko Shamte grew up in Dar es Salaam but spent some of her early years in the United States of America as well as Asia. Her parents, Fulgence and Antonia Tingitana, father an engineer and mother, an education specialist encouraged the development of her writing skills by sending her to writing camps over the summer holidays. At Mzizima High School where she studied she formed an appreciation for history and music. She played the violin and was the chairperson of the music club. During a talent show at Zanaki Secondary School, she was a visiting performer for Radio One. At 17 years that performance went on to give her an entry into the media industry, with her own show on East Africa Radio.

Career 
After finishing her BSC in finance with a minor in media at Marymount College Manahattan College and in 2005 she went to work at East Africa Television as the Head of Programming. During her time at the television station she saw the creation and televising of the popular television programs Ze Comedy, Friday Night Live, 5 Live! and Nirvana. Ze Comedy is the highest ever rated comedy sketch show on Tanzanian television.

Seko Shamte started her own production company, Alkemist Media in 2008. producing programmes and films about Tanzania and Africa for international distribution. Starting with features on CNN's Inside Africa, including a story on Hashim Thabeet, Tanzania's NBA basketball player and his contribution to his community in Tanzanians; a story on the migration of Maasai men in Tanzania. (Inside Story) This was followed by a series of other pieces for CNN, ABC networks in the United States and BBC in the UK.

Mkwawa: Shujaa wa mashujaa 
In 2011, her first feature-length documentary was released, Mkwawa: Shujaa wa Mashujaa. which she had developed for sixteen years. The critique of a history teacher on Chief Mkwawa being ‘a coward, as most African leaders are…’ gave her pause and wanting to challenge that critique, she researched Chief Mkwawa's history for herself. When the story was ready, she applied for the Tanzania Media Fund (TMF) and won the grant. The documentary was released in 2011.

The Team Tanzania 
Following Mkwawa she went to co-write, produce and direct a series called ‘The Team: Tanzania. This story focused on gender inequality in Tanzania looking to transform society’s gender norms.  The story has two teenage girls, Upendo and Sophia, and their struggle for identity. The thirteen part series was in collaboration with the NGO Search for Common Ground and aired on East Africa Television. The series has gone on to be viewed on the youtube platform.

Home Coming 
In 2015, her feature film Home Coming was released in Dar es Salaam. The story is an examination on corruption and how it perpetuates itself, generation after generation. 

Home Coming was well received by the Tanzanian Film Industry. The film went on to be selected to play at the Pan African Film Festival in 2017.

Seko’s next project is slated to be a documentary on Julius Kambarage Nyerere, the first president of Tanzania.

Filmography

References 

Tanzanian women film directors
Tanzanian women in business
Living people
1981 births